This list of Ford Falcon GT motorsport victories includes the Australian Touring Car Championship. From 1965 to 1972 the ATCC was open to Group C Improved Production Touring Cars and to Group C Touring Cars from 1973. From 1969 to 1972, Group E Series Production Touring Cars were also eligible to compete for the ATCC.

The Australian Manufacturers' Championship was open to Group E Series Production Touring Cars in 1971 and 1972 and then to Group C Touring Cars from 1973.

The "Bathurst 500" endurance races were open to production sedans up to and including 1971 and to Group E Series Production Touring Cars in 1972. Subsequent "Bathurst 1000" races were open to Group C Touring Cars.

Race and rally victories

Championship and series victories

Note 1: Moffat drove a Ford XC Falcon GS 500 Hardtop in Rounds 8, 9 and 10 of the 1977 Australian Touring Car Championship

References

GT
1970s cars
Motorsport in Bathurst, New South Wales
Australia sport-related lists
Motorsport-related lists
Auto racing lists